Ulrik Nordberg  (born 22 August 1993) is a Swedish ski orienteering competitor.

He won a gold medal in men's sprint at the 2017 World Ski Orienteering Championships.

References

1993 births
Living people
Swedish orienteers
Ski-orienteers
21st-century Swedish people